Preston Greyhound Stadium was a greyhound racing stadium in Acregate Lane, east of Preston, Lancashire, England.

Origins
A company called the Preston Greyhound Racing Association had employed a local labour force to build and run a new greyhound stadium situated in the Ribbleton Ward in east Preston. The site chosen was partly on a recreation ground next door to the 1914 built Waverley Park Cotton
Mill (the last cotton mill to be built in Preston). The track which was on the south side of houses on Miller Road was accessed from Acregate Lane.

Racing was planned for every Monday, Wednesday, Friday and Saturday evenings; this was common practice at the time and before a restriction was introduced as to which nights tracks were allowed to race. The paddock and racing kennels were literally constructed next door to houses in Oxley Road which must have been very noisy for the residents during racing. The greyhounds would only be housed during racing with the resident kennels situated on a 26-acre site called Sykes Holt in the village of Mellor Brook six miles to the east. There were 100 kennels with the addition of rest kennels and exercising accommodation.

Opening
The opening meeting took place on On Thursday 5 May 1932 under National Greyhound Racing Club rules. Sir Meyrick Hollins the High Sheriff of Lancashire and chairman of Preston North End F.C. officially declared the stadium open. The very first winner that night was Quaker Prince over
527 yards in a time of 32.33 secs watched by an estimated crowd of 7,000.

Early history
In 1933 the Preston Greyhound Racing Association opened a second track called Derby Greyhound Stadium. Despite the Great Depression greyhound racing was financially successful.

Mr E Harrison became the Racing Manager in the early 1950s and would remain in the position for twenty years.

1960s
During the 1960s the George Gooch trained Stately Boy claimed both the Ebor Stakes and Lincoln competitions and kennelmate Greenane Token won the Midland Flat trophy, the only other trainer attached to Preston at the time was Bill Keenan.

Racing was now restricted to licensed race days and Preston raced every Thursday and Saturday at 7.15pm with the feature annual event being the Lancashire Puppy Championship. R W Payne former White City, Manchester Racing Manager joined the track as general manager and joint-racing manager.

1970s
In 1971 Jack Hurt joined the training ranks that would increase and consist of Farringdon, Humphreys, Mengala and Mercer. In 1972 there was a major fire which resulted in serious damage to the main stand and required a significant rebuild.

Sister track Derby suffered a shortage of dogs in 1976 which resulted in the Preston trainers supplying greyhounds for the track. In May 1978 Preston itself was suffering from financial troubles and was forced to close but would re-open the same year under independent rules (unaffiliated to a governing body).

1980s
The track remained independent for ten years offering a significant prize of £2,500 to the winner of the annual Preston Derby. The owner, Frank Boyle, brought in Peter O’Dowd as general and racing manager.

Closure
The ownership of the track switched to David Webb, who then sold the track for housing. By coincidence former sister track Derby also closed during 1988.greyhound racing The last meeting was held at Preston on 3 December 1988, and today the stadium site would be found where the housing exists on Canterbury Road and Harling Road.

Track records

References

Defunct greyhound racing venues in the United Kingdom
Buildings and structures in Preston